Basinów refers to the following places in Poland:

 Basinów, Kozienice County
 Basinów, Wyszków County